Yoav Hofmayster (born 25 December 2000) is an Israeli professional footballer who plays as a defensive midfielder for Maccabi Petah Tikva on loan from Austrian club LASK.

Club career
On 2 February 2022, Hofmayster joined Maccabi Petah Tikva on loan until the end of the season.

References

External links
 
 
 

1998 births
Living people
Israeli footballers
Israeli Jews
Association football midfielders
Maccabi Tel Aviv F.C. players
Beitar Tel Aviv Bat Yam F.C. players
Hapoel Nir Ramat HaSharon F.C. players
LASK players
Hapoel Ironi Kiryat Shmona F.C. players
Hapoel Tel Aviv F.C. players
Maccabi Petah Tikva F.C. players
Liga Leumit players
Israeli Premier League players
Israeli expatriate footballers
Expatriate footballers in Austria
Israeli expatriate sportspeople in Austria
Footballers from Hod HaSharon